Ray Ryan may refer to:

 Ray Ryan (hurler) (born 1986), Irish hurler
 Ray Ryan (businessman) (1904–1977), American gambler, oilman, promoter, and developer
 Ray Ryan (baseball) (died 1958), minor league baseball player, manager, team owner and league president